College of Education, Igueben is a state owned government tertiary institution located in Igueben Local Government Area of Edo State, Southern part of Nigeria. The institution was established in 1980 by the Governor of the defunct Bendel State, Professor Ambrose Folorunsho Alli. The college is one of the several government approved tertiary institutions located in Edo Central Senatorial district in Edo State. The institution is accredited by National Universities Commission (NUC). The institution was established with the goal of training educators in Nigeria. Graduates of the institution are awarded the National Certificates in Education (NCE).

Courses 
 Agricultural Science
 Biology / Chemistry
 Chemistry / Integrated Science
 Business Education
 Biology / Integrated Science
 Chemistry / Mathematics
 Chemistry / Physics
 Computer Education /Physics
 Computer Education /Accounting
 Computer Science / Secretariat Study
 Computer Science Education / Mathematics
 Economics / Mathematics
 Economics / Social Studies
 English /Political Science
 English / Social Studies
 Geography / Social Studies
 Integrated Science / Mathematics Education
 Integrated Science /Physics
 Physical and Health Education
 Political Science / Social Studies
 Threatre Art
 Primary Education Studies

Closure and re-opening 
The College of Education, Igueben, was closed down during the military government era in 1984. The institution was however reopened in 2006 under the administration of Chief (Dr.) Lucky Igbinedion, the then Governor of Edo State.

Campus structure 
In 2020, the government of Edo State, under the leadership of the state governor, Mr. Godwin Obaseki, transformed the individual Colleges of Education in the state to one central college of education called Edo State College of Education. The College of Education, Igueben was made a campus of the state college of Education.

References 

Universities and colleges in Nigeria
1980 establishments in Nigeria
Educational institutions established in 1980